These are the front benches of Enda Kenny from 2002 until 2011, before he became Taoiseach.

Initial front bench
 Enda Kenny - Leader and Spokesperson on the North
 Richard Bruton - Deputy Leader and Spokesperson on Finance
 Bernard Durkan - Chief Whip
 Jim O'Keeffe - Spokesperson for Justice, Equality & Law Reform  
 Dinny McGinley - Spokesperson for Defence 
 Phil Hogan - Spokesperson on Enterprise, Trade & Employment
 Olwyn Enright - Spokesperson on Education & Science 
 Bernard Allen - Spokesperson on Environment & Local Government 
 Simon Coveney - Spokesperson on Communications, Marine & Natural Resources 
 Billy Timmins - Spokesperson on Agriculture & Food 
 Denis Naughten - Spokesperson on Transport 
 Gay Mitchell - Spokesperson on Foreign Affairs 
 Jimmy Deenihan - Spokesperson on Arts, Sport & Tourism
 Fergus O'Dowd - Spokesperson on Community, Rural & Gaeltacht Affairs
 Paul Connaughton - Spokesperson on Regional Development
 Michael Ring - Spokesperson on Social & Family Affairs 
 Olivia Mitchell - Spokesperson on for Health & Children
 John Bruton - Spokesperson without portfolio

2004 reshuffle
 Enda Kenny - Leader and Spokesperson on the North
 Richard Bruton - Deputy Leader and Spokesperson on Finance
 Paul Kehoe - Chief Whip 
 Jim O'Keeffe - Spokesperson on Justice & Law Reform
 Billy Timmins - Spokesperson on Defence
 Phil Hogan - Spokesperson on Enterprise, Trade & Employment
 Olwyn Enright - Spokesperson on Education & Science
 Fergus O'Dowd - Spokesperson on the Environment, Heritage & Local Government
 Bernard Durkan - Spokesperson on Communications & Natural Resources
 Denis Naughten - Spokesperson on Agriculture & Food
 Olivia Mitchell - Spokesperson on Transport
 John Perry - Spokesperson on Marine
 Bernard Allen - Spokesperson on Foreign Affairs
 Jimmy Deenihan - Spokesperson on Arts, Sport & Tourism
 Dinny McGinley - Spokesperson on Community, Rural & Gaeltacht Affairs
 Paul Connaughton - Spokesperson on Regional Development & Emigrant Affairs
 David Stanton - Spokesperson on Social, Family Affairs & Equality
 Liam Twomey - Spokesperson on Health & Children
 Michael Noonan - Spokesperson without portfolio

2007 reshuffle
 Enda Kenny - Leader and Spokesperson on the North
 Richard Bruton - Deputy Leader and Spokesperson on Finance
 Paul Kehoe - Chief Whip
 Charles Flanagan - Spokesperson on Justice & Law Reform
 Jimmy Deenihan - Spokesperson onDefence
 Leo Varadkar - Spokesperson on Enterprise, Trade & Innovation
 Brian Hayes - Spokesperson on Education & Skills
 Olwyn Enright - Spokesperson on Social Protection
 Phil Hogan - Spokesperson on Environment, Heritage & Local Government
 Simon Coveney - Spokesperson on Communications, Energy & Natural Resources
 Michael Creed - Spokesperson on Agriculture, Fisheries & Food
 Fergus O'Dowd - Spokesperson on Transport & Marine
 Billy Timmins - Spokesperson on Foreign Affairs
 Olivia Mitchell - Spokesperson on Tourism, Culture & Sport
 James Reilly - Spokesperson on Health
 Michael Ring - Spokesperson on Community, Equality & Gaeltacht Affairs
 Denis Naughten - Spokesperson on Immigration & Integration
 Alan Shatter - Spokesperson on Children
 Frances Fitzgerald - Seanad leader

2010 reshuffle
This was announced following the 2010 heave against Kenny's leadership.
 Enda Kenny - Leader
 James Reilly - Deputy Leader and Spokesperson on Health & Children, (with responsibility for policy coordination & implementation)
 Paul Kehoe - Chief Whip (with responsibility for political reform)
 Michael Noonan - Spokesperson on Finance
 Alan Shatter - Spokesperson on Justice & Law Reform
 David Stanton - Spokesperson on Defence
 Richard Bruton - Spokesperson on Enterprise, Jobs & Economic Planning (including public service reform)
 John Perry - Spokesperson on Small Business
 Fergus O'Dowd - Spokesperson on Education & Skills
 Deirdre Clune - Spokesperson on Innovation & Research
 Michael Ring - Spokesperson on Social Protection
 Phil Hogan - Spokesperson on Environment, Heritage & Local Government
 Leo Varadkar - Spokesperson on Communications & Natural Resources
 Andrew Doyle - Spokesperson on Agriculture, Fisheries & Food
 Simon Coveney - Spokesperson on Transport
 Seán Barrett - Spokesperson on Foreign Affairs
 Jimmy Deenihan - Spokesperson on Tourism, Culture & Sport
 Frank Feighan - Spokesperson on Community, Equality & Gaeltacht Affairs
 Catherine Byrne - Spokesperson on Older Citizens
 Charlie Flanagan - Spokesperson on Children

See also
 Frontbench team of Eamon Gilmore

References

2002 establishments in Ireland
2002 in Irish politics
2011 disestablishments in Ireland
Enda Kenny
Fine Gael
Kenny